Heme B or haem B (also known as protoheme IX) is the most abundant heme. Hemoglobin and myoglobin are examples of oxygen transport proteins that contain heme B.  The peroxidase family of enzymes also contain heme B.  The COX-1 and COX-2 enzymes (cyclooxygenase) of recent fame, also contain heme B at one of two active sites.

Generally, heme B is attached to the surrounding protein matrix (known as the apoprotein) through a single coordination bond between the heme iron and an amino-acid side-chain.

Both hemoglobin and myoglobin have a coordination bond to an evolutionarily-conserved histidine, while nitric oxide synthase and cytochrome P450 have a coordination bond to an evolutionarily-conserved cysteine bound to the iron center of heme B.

Since the iron in heme B containing proteins is bound to the four nitrogens of the porphyrin (forming a plane) and a single electron donating atom of the protein, the iron is often in a pentacoordinate state. When oxygen or the toxic carbon monoxide is bound the iron becomes hexacoordinated.
The correct structures of heme B and heme S were first elucidated by German chemist Hans Fischer.

References

Tetrapyrroles
Biomolecules